The 1994 Tennessee Volunteers football team represented the University of Tennessee in the 1994 NCAA Division I-A football season.  Phillip Fulmer was the head coach.  Freshman Peyton Manning began the season as Tennessee's third-string quarterback, but injuries to Todd Helton and Jerry Colquitt forced him into the lineup in a game against Mississippi State, which the Volunteers lost 24–21. In his first start the following week against Washington State, the Vols won, 10–9.  They lost only one more game the rest of the season, finishing 8–4 with a 45–23 victory over Virginia Tech in the Gator Bowl.

Schedule

Roster

Team players drafted into the NFL

Awards and honors

References

Tennessee
Tennessee Volunteers football seasons
Gator Bowl champion seasons
Tennessee Volunteers football